WSTY-LP, UHF analog channel 23, was a low-powered Family Channel-affiliated television station licensed to Hammond, Louisiana, United States. The station was owned by Pontchartrain Investors, LLC. It served portions of the Baton Rouge and New Orleans television markets. On cable, the station was seen on Spectrum channel 22. Its transmitter was located off US Highway 51 just south of Natalbany, Louisiana and north of Hammond.

History
The channel began as a translator for independent station WBTR (then known as WKG-TV) in 1988. As original station owner Woody Jenkins and Great Oaks Broadcasting had problems garnering cable coverage in the Greater Baton Rouge area, he set up translator stations, including W39AW, to broaden the station's cable coverage. W39AW also brought UPN programming to the region when the network began operations. In 1996, the station changed its channel to 23.

By the mid 1990s, Jenkins succeeded in gaining enough cable coverage for WBTR that he began to sell off his former translators or adapt them to bring localized programming to the communities served. In late 1998, Jenkins began different test formats for a TV station to cover the Florida Parishes (Tangipahoa, St. Helena, Livingston, and St. Tammany Parishes) with the station signing on by the end of December. On December 16, 1998, the station signed on with localized programming to the Hammond-Ponchatoula region as well as with a primary affiliation with America One and a secondary affiliation with America's Voice.

Like with WBTR, Woody Jenkins struggled to get WSTY-LP on the local cable provider, Charter Communications, given the limited number of channels available at the time. Exercising the right of must-carry, he filed a complaint with the FCC against Charter asking for cable coverage and reparations. By August 1, 1999, Charter began carrying WSTY-LP on its lineup.

In 2005, Jenkins and Great Oaks Broadcasting sold the station to Veritas Broadcasting Company, and the station soon fell into the hands of Pontchartrain Investors, LLC. Most recently, WSTY-LP was affiliated with The Family Channel (previously My Family TV). It is unknown as to when the station dropped its America One affiliation.

Station owners Pontchartrain Investors also had a construction permit to convert WSTY-LP's signal from analog to digital on channel 38.

The FCC cancelled WSTY-LP's license on June 8, 2021 due to the station failing to file an application for license renewal.

Programming
Current local programming for WSTY includes: The Great Outdoorsmen, Louisiana's Bayou Country Outdoors, and Spiritual Outdoor Adventures.

References

External links

Television stations in Louisiana
Television channels and stations established in 1988
1988 establishments in Louisiana
Defunct television stations in the United States
Television channels and stations disestablished in 2021
2021 disestablishments in Louisiana
Defunct mass media in Louisiana